The Protestant Theological Institute is a Protestant seminary and private university in Cluj-Napoca, Romania. The state-recognized institution trains ministers for four separate Protestant denominations: Calvinism (the Reformed Church in Romania), Lutheranism (the majority-Hungarian Evangelical Lutheran Church, the majority-Saxon Evangelical Church of the Augsburg Confession), and Unitarianism (the Unitarian Church of Transylvania).

The Protestant Institute is coordinated by five bishoprics: one Unitarian and two Lutheran, together with the Reformed Diocese of Királyhágómellék and the Reformed Diocese of Transylvania. Its Cluj-Napoca center houses two branches — the Reformed-Evangelical Faculty (offering training for members of the Reformed Church and the Evangelical Lutheran Church), and the Unitarian Faculty. In addition to these, the Institute includes a Saxon-Evangelical Faculty, which is based in Sibiu and is maintained by the Evangelical Church of Augustan Confession.

The Institute was founded in 1948, uniting the Cluj-based Reformed Theological College and the Unitarian Theological Academy as two faculties, as well as being the first local seminary for Lutherans. It has a claim to being the sole Protestant theological institution to teach in two languages (Hungarian and German) and to have two separate local sections.

Other schools
 The Unitarian Church of Transylvania also maintains separately the John Sigismund Unitarian Academy or Unitarian Gymnasium in Cluj-Napoca (founded 1554).

Educational institutions established in 1948
Cluj
Unitarian seminaries
Theological Institute
Cluj
Theological Institute
Education in Sibiu
Unitarian Church of Transylvania
Universities in Cluj-Napoca
Seminaries and theological colleges in Romania
1948 establishments in Romania
Lutheran universities and colleges in Europe